Syracuse New Times was a weekly alternative newspaper published in Syracuse, New York, by William Brod and distributed throughout the Central New York region. It was owned by All Times Publishing LLC. The publication was released every Wednesday, printing 36,000 copies and distributed to approximately 1150 locations in Central New York.

References

External links
 

Alternative weekly newspapers published in the United States
Defunct newspapers published in Syracuse, New York
Publications established in 1969
Publications disestablished in 2019